In the Cut is an American television sitcom created by Bentley Kyle Evans that aired on Bounce TV from August 25, 2015, to November 18, 2020. The series stars Dorien Wilson as Jay Weaver, a barbershop owner who meets a young man named Kenny (Ken Lawson) the unknown biological son from a fling thirty years ago. The first season has six episodes. John Marshall Jones, Kellita Smith, Dorion Renaud and Laura Hayes are also series regulars, while Vanessa Bell Calloway and Golden Brooks had recurring roles.

In the Cut has become the most-watched original series premiere in Bounce TV history. On April 13, 2016 Bounce TV renewed the show for a second season. On April 14, 2016 Bounce TV renewed the show for a third season which premiered on July 11, 2017. On August 3, 2017 the show was renewed for a fourth season that premiered on July 2, 2018.

The fifth season premiered on July 15, 2019.

On March 19, 2020, it was announced that the sixth season would premiere on April 1, 2020.

Premise
A local barbershop owner Jay Weaver, meets his illegitimate son Kenny he never knew about, 30 years after he's born. After Kenny shows up looking for his father, the two attempt to start a relationship. After Jay allows Kenny to move in with him and work at the barbershop, the two begin a new journey as father and son. Jay also owns a beauty salon next door, which was previously owned by his ex-wife Nadine, and is now owned by his new wife Cheryl. Cheryl is a feisty business-savvy woman who runs the shop with her over-the-top sidekick, Percy. The show follows Jay's best friend Smitty and Chef Mable who owns tables in the same strip mall.

Cast and characters

Main
Dorien Wilson as Jay Weaver, the owner of barbershop Jay's Chop Shop, and Kenny's father
Ken Lawson as Kenny Clark, Jay's illegitimate son
John Marshall Jones as Clevon "Smitty" Smith, Jay's best friend and fellow barber (season 1–6)
Dorion Renaud as Percy, a hairstylist and Cheryls best friend. (season 1-7)
Jackée Harry as Nadine Weaver (season 1), Jay's ex-wife and former owner of Nadine's Shop
Kellita Smith as Cheryl (season 2-7), the new owner of the beauty salon Cheryl's, and Jay's wife 
Laura Hayes as Mable (season 2–6), restaurant owner of Mable's Tables
Mark Curry as Wade (season 7), Cheryl's ex-con brother
Kim Coles as Trish Devoe (season 7), the new owner of Mable's Tables

Recurring
Chastity Dotson as Angelique Peters, Kenny's wife
Christy St. John as Karen (season 6–7) the waitress at Mable's Tables

Guest stars
Golden Brooks as Dawn
Trina McGee as Kirsten
Earthquake as Rufus, Smitty and Kenny's landlord
Stevie Mack as Barbershop Bill

Episodes

Season 1 (2015)

Season 2 (2016)

Season 3 (2017)

Season 4 (2018)

Season 5 (2019)

Season 6 (2020)

Season 7

References

External links

2010s American black sitcoms
2020s American black sitcoms
2015 American television series debuts
English-language television shows
Bounce TV original programming
Television series about families